Rom Di Prisco is a contemporary Canadian composer and electronic audio producer of music for video games, movies and television programs. He also produces remixes for other music artists. This article lists his works.

Video games

Film and television

Music releases

References

External links 
 Rom di Prisco Getty Images. Accessed 4 January 2014.
 Rom di Prisco SoundCloud. Accessed 4 January 2014.
 Rom di Prisco Discogs. Accessed 4 January 2014.
 Rom di Prisco IMDb. Accessed 4 January 2014.

Di Prisco, Rom